The Kybunpark, formerly known as AFG Arena, is a multi-use stadium in St. Gallen, Switzerland, completed in 2008. It is used mostly for football matches and hosts the home matches of FC St. Gallen of the Swiss Super League. It replaces the Espenmoos stadium. 

The stadium has a capacity of 20,000 people. Between 2008 and 2016 the stadium was named after the sponsor Arbonia-Forster-Gruppe (AFG). In July 2016 the name was changed to Kybunpark.

When it was completed, FC St. Gallen had just been relegated to the Challenge League. The first match in the new stadium was played on 30 May 2008 when Switzerland won against Liechtenstein 3:0 (18,000 spectators). The official inauguration was held on 5 July 2008.

Starting July 2012, the Kybunpark was the temporary home of FC Wil, while the second division side built its own new stadium to meet Swiss Football League requirements.

The Kybunpark is also used for international games between national football teams, such as Brazil or Spain.

International matches

See also 
List of football stadiums in Switzerland

External links
Stadion AFG Arena St. Gallen 
FC St. Gallen – kybunpark

References

Football venues in Switzerland
Buildings and structures in St. Gallen (city)
Sport in St. Gallen (city)